Harry Elbert "Deerfoot" Bay (January 17, 1878 – March 19, 1952) was a professional baseball player who played outfield in the major leagues from 1901 to 1908. Bay played for the Cincinnati Reds and Cleveland Bronchos/Naps.

Early life
He attended Peoria High School, winning medals in the 1896 and 1897 Illinois High School Association state track and field meets. He played high school baseball with Harry Frazee, a future owner of the Boston Red Sox. 

After high school, he was on a barnstorming team in the Midwest that featured star pitcher Joe McGinnity, but Bay also attracted attention, signing a professional contract in 1898 with a team in Lincoln, Illinois. Bay acquired two nicknames; "Deerfoot" referred to his speed, and "Sliver" was a reference to his ,  frame.

Career

By 1901, Bay was in the major leagues with the Cincinnati Reds. In May 1902, Bay was released by the Reds and signed by the Cleveland Bronchos. He led the American League in stolen bases in 1903 and 1904 with 45 and 38 respectively as a member of the Cleveland Naps.

Bay had a .301 batting average and 36 stolen bases in 1905, but he injured his shoulder while sliding into a base and hurt his knee catching a ball on a muddy field. The knee injury slowed him down for the remainder of his career, and he never played a full season again. He retired in 1908. In 675 games over eight seasons, Bay posted a .273 batting average (722-for-2640) with 413 runs, 42 triples, 5 home runs, 141 RBIs, 169 stolen bases and 195 bases on balls. He recorded a .968 fielding percentage playing at all three outfield positions.

Bay played cornet and piano, and during his playing career he sometimes appeared in concerts and skits.

After baseball
After retiring from baseball in 1908, he returned to Peoria, became a bandleader at the local Apollo Theater, and toured the vaudeville circuit with Guy Kibbee.  He later worked for the Peoria fire department and the Illinois Secretary of State.

In February 1952, Bay slipped while walking on ice and broke several ribs. He died a few weeks later.

See also
 List of Major League Baseball annual stolen base leaders

References

External links

1878 births
1952 deaths
Major League Baseball outfielders
Cincinnati Reds players
Cleveland Bronchos players
Cleveland Naps players
American League stolen base champions
Nashville Vols players
Bloomington Bloomers players
Mason City Claydiggers players
Rock Island Islanders players
Alton Blues players
Baseball players from Illinois
Sportspeople from Peoria, Illinois
People from Pontiac, Illinois
Vaudeville performers
Minor league baseball managers